Nalani & Sarina are an American soul-rock duo from New Jersey consisting of identical twin sisters Nalani and Sarina Bolton. They graduated high school early to pursue music full-time, performing up and down the east coast since age 16. Their sibling harmonies are showcased in their live shows and recordings, which also feature them playing a variety of instruments including keyboard, guitar, and ukulele.

Career 
Born into a musical household, their education started early, being trained in classical piano as children to performing opera in high school. They naturally transitioned from performing other artists' music to their own. 
In 2014, their song "Start All Over" was chosen as WXPN's Philly Local Pick of the Day. Later that year, they did an interview on SiriusXM's 'Kick out the Jams' (hosted by Dave Marsh) alongside Sam Moore of Sam & Dave where they performed his song, "When Something's Wrong with My Baby" on the air, which led to an invite to perform the song with him at his New York City show at the City Winery.

In 2015, they released their EP, Scattered World. The music video for their song "Get Away" was featured on sites such as MTVu, VH1, CMT, as well as other video outlets nationwide.  In television, they landed a feature in NJTV's "State of the Arts". In December 2015, Nalani & Sarina performed at a Kristen Ann Carr Fund charity event at the Sony Wonder Building where they met and sang for Bruce Springsteen. They were also interviewed by Mike McGrath for his Christmas Radio Show on NPR/WHYY.

In 2016, they won two Homey Awards presented by WSTW (Wilmington, DE) for "Best Pop Song" and "Best EP". Later that year, WHYY-TV's "Friday Arts" did a segment on the sisters, which included an exclusive interview and performance in Philadelphia.

In 2017, Nalani & Sarina spoke/performed at a TEDx event held at Firefly Music Festival in Dover, DE.

LA-based publication, Music Connection named Nalani & Sarina in their Hot 100 Live Unsigned Artists and Bands in 2014, Top 25 New Music Critiques in 2015, and reviewed their live show in Hollywood, California in 2016. NJ.com featured them in "Must-hear NJ" in 2015, "35 NJ Bands You Must Hear in 2016", and "Identical Twins with a Music Mission" writeup in 2017. They have opened for artists such as A Great Big World, Mary Lambert, and Howie Day among others. Both in the studio and live performances, their backing band has included Will Lee (bassist), Jim Hines, Tommy Mandel, Oscar Rodriguez, Chris Kuffner, Tom Malone (musician), Leni Stern, and Joe Bonadio.

Discography

 Carriage House Sessions (2012)
 Lessons Learned (2014)
 Scattered World (2015)
 ''The Circle (2018)

References

External links 
Official website

Rock music groups from New Jersey
Sibling duos